This is a recap of the 1995 season for the Professional Bowlers Association (PBA) Tour.  It was the tour's 37th season, and consisted of 30 events.

The "semi-retired" Dave Husted won his 12th title and second BPAA U.S. Open crown in front of the largest crowd to ever witness a PBA event. After the qualifying at Bowl One Lanes in Troy, Michigan, the TV finals moved to Detroit's Joe Louis Arena, where a paid audience of 7,212 were in attendance. Bowling in his first TV finals, Scott Alexander was the surprise winner at the Chevrolet PBA National Championship.

Mike Aulby captured the Brunswick World Tournament of Champions to complete his quest for the "triple crown" of PBA majors. He joined Billy Hardwick, Johnny Petraglia and Pete Weber as the PBA's only triple crown winners to date. As the Tour's leading money winner for 1995, Aulby was also voted the PBA Player of the Year.

At the Northwest Classic in July, John Handegard became the oldest PBA Tour champion. Handegard was 57 years, 55 days old. Hall of Famer Buzz Fazio was 56 years, 307 days old when he won a standard PBA tour event in December, 1964.

Another record was set late in the year at the AMF Dick Weber Classic, where David Ozio rolled a four-game total of 1,070 pins en route to the title. This broke the 11-year-old record of 1,050 pins set by Nelson Burton, Jr.

Tournament schedule

References

External links
1995 Season Schedule

Professional Bowlers Association seasons
1995 in bowling